Rita Bellens (born 29 September 1962, in Antwerp) is a Belgian politician and member of the New Flemish Alliance. She was a member of the Chamber of Representatives for Antwerp from 2014 to 2019, alderman of Duffel from 2015 to 2019, and has been chairman of the city council since January 2019.

References

Living people
1962 births
Politicians from Antwerp
21st-century Belgian women politicians
21st-century Belgian politicians
Members of the Chamber of Representatives (Belgium)
New Flemish Alliance politicians